The 8-cubic honeycomb or octeractic honeycomb is the only regular space-filling tessellation (or honeycomb) in Euclidean 8-space.

It is analogous to the square tiling of the plane and to the cubic honeycomb of 3-space, and the tesseractic honeycomb of 4-space.

There are many different Wythoff constructions of this honeycomb. The most symmetric form is regular, with Schläfli symbol {4,36,4}. Another form has two alternating hypercube facets (like a checkerboard) with Schläfli symbol {4,35,31,1}. The lowest symmetry Wythoff construction has 256 types of facets around each vertex and a prismatic product Schläfli symbol {∞}8.

Related honeycombs 
The [4,36,4], Coxeter group generates 511 permutations of uniform tessellations, 271 with unique symmetry and 270 with unique geometry. The expanded 8-cubic honeycomb is geometrically identical to the 8-cubic honeycomb.

The 8-cubic honeycomb can be alternated into the 8-demicubic honeycomb, replacing the 8-cubes with 8-demicubes, and the alternated gaps are filled by 8-orthoplex facets.

Quadrirectified 8-cubic honeycomb 
A quadrirectified 8-cubic honeycomb, contains all trirectified 8-orthoplex facets and is the Voronoi tessellation of the D8* lattice.

See also 
List of regular polytopes

References 
 Coxeter, H.S.M. Regular Polytopes, (3rd edition, 1973), Dover edition,  p. 296, Table II: Regular honeycombs
 Kaleidoscopes: Selected Writings of H. S. M. Coxeter, edited by F. Arthur Sherk, Peter McMullen, Anthony C. Thompson, Asia Ivic Weiss, Wiley-Interscience Publication, 1995,  
 (Paper 24) H.S.M. Coxeter, Regular and Semi-Regular Polytopes III, [Math. Zeit. 200 (1988) 3-45]

Honeycombs (geometry)
9-polytopes
Regular tessellations